Aphaenops linderi is a species of beetle in the subfamily Trechinae. It was described by Jeannel in 1938.

References

linderi
Beetles described in 1938